"Show Her" is a song written by Mike Reid, and recorded by American country music artist Ronnie Milsap. It was released in October 1983 as the third single from the album Keyed Up.  The song was Milsap's twenty-fifth number one country hit.  The single went to number one for one week and spent a total of fourteen weeks on the country chart.

Charts

Weekly charts

Year-end charts

References
 

1983 singles
1983 songs
Ronnie Milsap songs
Songs written by Mike Reid (singer)
Song recordings produced by Tom Collins (record producer)
RCA Records singles